is a song recorded by Japanese duo Yoasobi. It appears as the seventh track on their second EP, The Book 2, which was released on December 1, 2021, through Sony Music Entertainment Japan, as its promotional single. Written by Ayase, the song featured as a theme song of the stage of the same name, Moshi mo Inochi ga Egaketara, written by screenwriter Osamu Suzuki, and based on it.

Release and promotion

On June 2, 2021, Yoasobi was announced to be in charge of writing and singing a theme song for the stage , starring Kei Tanaka, Mario Kuroba, and Hijiri Kojima. The stage was written by Osamu Suzuki, a screenwriter who also wrote Tsuki Ōji, a based novel for the duo's song "Haruka". Performed on August 12–22 at Tokyo Metropolitan Theatre, the story depicts a man who draws a picture as the time of life gradually decreases in order to share it with someone. On October 1, the duo announced the stage theme song would be included on their second EP The Book 2, scheduled for release on December 1. 

The full version of "Moshi mo Inochi ga Egaketara" was played for the first time at Tokyo FM's Jump Up Melodies Top 20 on November 26. An accompanying music video of "Moshi mo Inochi ga Egaketara" was premiered on December 12, 2021, directed by Asami Kiyokawa, who also handled art direction of the stage. Yoasobi gave a debut performance of "Moshi mo Inochi ga Egaketara" on December 30, 2021, at the 63rd Japan Record Awards, alongside "Kaibutsu", and "Yasashii Suisei". 

The standalone version of the song was surprise-released on August 12, 2022, to commemorate the anniversary of the stage premiere. The English version of the song, titled "If I Could Draw Life", was included on the duo's second English-language EP E-Side 2, released on November 18, 2022.

Commercial performance

In Japan, "Moshi mo Inochi ga Egaketara" debuted at number 45 on the Oricon Combined Singles Chart and peaked at number 37. It landed at number three on the Digital Singles (Single Track) Chart, selling 11,823 download units in its first week. The song entered Billboard Japan Hot 100 at number 32, collecting 10,084 downloads (number three on the Download Songs), and ranked number 66 on the Streaming Songs in its first week.

Credits and personnel

Credits adapted from The Book 2 liner notes and YouTube.

Song
 Ayase – writer, producer
 Ikura – vocals
 Osamu Suzuki – based story writer
 Takayuki Saitō – vocal recording
 Masahiko Fukui – mixing

Music video
 Asami Kiyokawa – director, storyboard, key animation
 Hideaki Inaba – CG director
 Hideyuki Matsui (P.I.C.S) – animation producer

Charts

Release history

References

External links
 
 The stage Moshi mo Inochi ga Egaketara script

2021 songs
Japanese-language songs
Yoasobi songs